Noel Armando Vásquez Mendoza (born October 19, 1976 in Capacho) is a Venezuelan former professional racing cyclist.

Major results

2000
 1st  Overall Vuelta al Táchira
1st Stages 4 & 6
2001
 1st  Overall Vuelta al Táchira
1st Stage 6
 5th Overall Vuelta a Colombia
2002
 2nd Overall Vuelta al Táchira
 1st Stages 7 & 11
2004
 2nd Overall Vuelta a Guatemala
2008
 National Road Championships
 1st  Road race
3rd Time trial
 1st Stage 5 Vuelta al Táchira
 6th Overall Clásico Ciclístico Banfoandes
2010
 3rd Overall Vuelta al Táchira
2011
 1st  Overall Vuelta a Trujillo
 3rd Overall Vuelta al Táchira
 1st Stage 11

External links

1976 births
Living people
Venezuelan male cyclists
People from Rocha Department
20th-century Venezuelan people
21st-century Venezuelan people